Emily Warfield is an American actress who made her acting debut with the TV movie Dream Date in 1989. She also co-starred in the movie The Man in the Moon with the then-unknown Reese Witherspoon in 1991.

Since then, she has appeared in a variety of guest roles on TV shows, from Doogie Howser, M.D. to L.A. Law. She also appeared in the last two Bonanza TV movies that aired on NBC in the early 1990s as Sarah, a member of that series' iconic Cartwright family.

Filmography

Film

Television

References

External links
 

1972 births
Living people
American film actresses
American television actresses
People from Arlington, Texas
21st-century American women